The 1864 United States presidential election in Iowa took place on November 8, 1864, as part of the 1864 United States presidential election. Iowa voters chose eight representatives, or electors, to the Electoral College, who voted for president and vice president.

Iowa was won by the incumbent President Abraham Lincoln (R-Illinois), running with former Senator and Military Governor of Tennessee Andrew Johnson, with 64.12% of the popular vote, against the 4th Commanding General of the United States Army George B. McClellan (D–New Jersey), running with Representative George H. Pendleton, with 35.88% of the vote.

Results

See also
 United States presidential elections in Iowa

References

Iowa
1864
1864 Iowa elections